Bailey T Capel (born 15 April 2000) is an Australian cricketer. He made his first-class debut for South Australia against New South Wales on 23 March 2022 during the 2021–22 Sheffield Shield season.

Capel was recently named the hairiest man at his home club of West Torrens DCC and is rumoured to have started shaving his moustache at the age of 9.

References

2000 births
Living people
Australian cricketers
South Australia cricketers